Osman's Dream is a mythological story about the life of Osman I, founder of the Ottoman Empire. The story describes a dream experienced by Osman while staying in the home of a religious figure, Sheikh Edebali, in which he sees a metaphorical vision predicting the growth and prosperity of an empire to be ruled by him and his descendants. The story emerged in the fifteenth century, more than a hundred years after Osman's death, and is thought to have been created in order to provide a foundational myth for the empire, as well as to embellish the life of Osman and explain his subsequent success. When Osman tells Sheikh Edebali about the dream, the dervish interprets it as a sign that Osman would achieve great glory and fame in the name of Islam, and allows Osman to marry his daughter Malhun (Rabia Bala) Hatun.

Ottoman writers attached great importance to this supposed dream of the founder of their empire.

Story 

Osman, a young prince, was known and praised widely for his religious piety. Osman began to visit a holy man, Sheikh Edebali (1206–1326), out of respect for his purity and learning.

One day when Osman and his brother Gokalp were visiting the castle of their neighbor, the lord of Ineani, an armed force approached the gate, led by the chief of Eskişehir and his ally, Michael of the Peaked Beard. (Michael was the Greek lord of Khirenkia, a fortified city at the foot of Phrygian Olympus.) They demanded that Osman be given up to them, but the lord of Inaeni refused to commit such a breach of hospitality. While the enemy lingered irresolutely around the castle wall, Osman and his brother seized a moment for a sudden attack. They chased the chief of Eskişehir off the field in disgrace, and took Michael of the Peaked Beard prisoner. The captive and the captors eventually became friends however; later, when Osman reigned as an independent prince, Michael sided with him against the Greeks, and was thenceforth one of the strongest supporters of the Ottoman power.

One night, when Osman was resting at Edebali's house (for the shelter of hospitality could never be denied even to the suitor

Interpretation and criticism 
Most of the translation in this text is based on History of Ottoman Turks (1878), which was also based on Von Hammer's research. The text is modernized and has some missing sections.

Scholars agree that the story was not contemporary to Osman and Edebali's daughter and that it was created in a later period. However, it is known that Sheikh Edebali was indeed a historical figure and that Osman likely did marry his daughter.

In popular culture 
This dream was also shown in the Turkish TV series, Kurulus: Osman.

References

Bibliography

 
 
 
 

13th century in the Ottoman Empire
Works of unknown authorship
Love stories